Stephen Michael Gopey is a Nigerian professional footballer who plays as a forward for Al-Arabi.

Club career 
In mid-season of the 2020–21 Nigeria Professional Football League, Gopey moved from Rivers United to Wikki Tourists.

On 23 July 2021, he signed for Ukrainian Premier League club Inhulets Petrove, on a three-year contract. Gopey made his league debut against Shakhtar Donetsk on 24 July 2021, scoring his team's lone goal in a 2–1 defeat.

References

External links
 Statistics at UAF website 
 
 
 

2000 births
Living people
Nigerian footballers
Association football forwards
Lobi Stars F.C. players
Rivers United F.C. players
Wikki Tourists F.C. players
FC Inhulets Petrove players
Al-Arabi SC (Kuwait) players
Nigeria Professional Football League players
Ukrainian Premier League players
Kuwait Premier League players
Nigerian expatriate footballers
Nigerian expatriate sportspeople in Ukraine
Expatriate footballers in Ukraine
Nigerian expatriate sportspeople in Kuwait
Expatriate footballers in Kuwait
Sportspeople from Warri